Bottoms Bridge is a small unincorporated community in New Kent County, Virginia, United States. Located on U.S. Route 60 and State Route 33 in modern times, it was named for a crossing of the Chickahominy River between New Kent and Henrico County.

References

Unincorporated communities in Virginia
Unincorporated communities in New Kent County, Virginia